André Hébuterne (3 September 1894 – 30 June 1992 in Paris) was a French painter.

Early life
Born in Meaux, in the Seine-et-Marne département of France, Hébuterne moved with his family to Paris, where as a young man he began to pursue a career in art. He introduced his younger sister,  Jeanne (1898–1920) to the artistic community in the Montparnasse Quarter, where she eventually became the partner of Modigliani. Following his sister's suicide, and the death of their parents, Hébuterne was given legal possession of Jeanne's personal papers and artwork. Her drawings and paintings were kept private until his widow  allowed public access to them.

Career
Hébuterne had limited success as an artist but made etchings that appeared in a 1948 reprint of a Gargantua book based on the François Rabelais creation.

References

1894 births
1992 deaths
People from Meaux
20th-century French painters
20th-century French male artists
French male painters
Modern painters
French etchers
20th-century French printmakers
19th-century French male artists